Percy Cooke Bishop (1869 – 1961) was a British journalist and philatelist who proposed what became the Roll of Distinguished Philatelists. He was appointed to the Roll in 1921.

References

British philatelists
1869 births
1961 deaths
Signatories to the Roll of Distinguished Philatelists
British male journalists